Barbara Ann Daniels (born 17 December 1964) is an English cricketer and former member of the English women's cricket team. She played nine Test matches and 55 One Day Internationals. She was part of England's squad that won the World Cup in 1993. She played domestic cricket for West Midlands and Staffordshire.

References

External links
 

1964 births
Living people
England women Test cricketers
England women One Day International cricketers
Staffordshire women cricketers
West Midlands women cricketers